The Inner West Light Rail is a  light rail line in Sydney, New South Wales, Australia, running from Central railway station through the Inner West to Dulwich Hill and serving 23 stops. It is the original line of the Sydney light rail network, and was originally known as Sydney Light Rail. Light rail services on the line are now branded as the L1 Dulwich Hill Line.

Most of the Inner West Light Rail is built on the path of a former freight railway line. The first section of light rail opened in 1997, and the line was extended in 2000 and 2014.

Operation and maintenance of the line is contracted to the ALTRAC Light Rail consortium by the New South Wales Government's transport authority, Transport for NSW. Services are operated by Transdev Sydney as a member of ALTRAC Light Rail.

Background
Most of the alignment of the Dulwich Hill Line had its origins as the Metropolitan Goods railway line. From the time when the Sydney Railway Company was formed in 1848, it had been the intention of the company to build a freight terminal at Darling Harbour. To this end, a railway line was constructed between the Sydney railway station (the predecessor to Central railway station) and Darling Harbour, which opened on 26 September 1855. This line was extended to Dulwich Hill via Lilyfield in 1922. A short branch from Lilyfield to Rozelle served another freight terminal.

With widespread use as a freight line throughout the early 20th century, the use of containers and the decentralisation of freight terminals in Sydney to places such as Port Botany and Chullora, Darling Harbour traffic was reduced considerably. The port closed and the area was redeveloped in the 1980s.

Construction
Construction and conversion of the first section of line from Central station to Wentworth Park started on 25 January 1996 and took 16 months to complete. The  line reused the former Darling Harbour goods railway line and the tram loop at Central station originally built for Sydney's former tram network, with a new section of track built along Hay Street to connect the two.

The original route opened for public operation with a limited 09:00 to 17:00 service on 11 August 1997 with three weeks of testing. The official public opening was conducted by State Premier Bob Carr on 31 August 1997.

This saw the light rail reach Lilyfield, which was then the limit of the closed section of the goods line.

Extension to Dulwich Hill

In 2009, goods traffic on the line between Rozelle and Dulwich Hill ceased and in February 2010, the Keneally Government announced a  extension of the light rail from Lilyfield to Dulwich Hill.

Work to upgrade the track and remove the overhead wiring began in August 2010. The project received planning approval in February 2011. The extension was originally scheduled to open in 2012, but in September 2011 the newly elected O'Farrell Government announced that it would not open until 2014, and that the cost had risen from $120 million to $176 million. The Greenway walking and cycling path which was to run alongside much of the route was deferred. The new government blamed hasty planning by their predecessor for the delay and cost overruns, and the lack of an active transport masterplan for the deferral of the Greenway.

John Holland Group was announced as the successful tenderer for the infrastructure works on 31 May 2012, covering the design and construction of the nine stops, bridge works, signalling and power supply. The extension opened on 27 March 2014.

Connection to the CBD and South East Light Rail

The line was closed between Central and Convention in January 2017 to allow for construction work at the George and Hay Street intersection as part of the CBD and South East Light Rail project. A further closure was required in January 2018 to install a junction between the two lines. The connection will be used by trams of the CBD and South East line to access a maintenance facility at Lilyfield.

Ownership & operation

The line was owned by the Sydney Light Rail Company (SLRC) when it opened in 1997. The company was formed in March 1994 was awarded a 30-year concession to operate the light rail system until February 2028 when ownership would pass to the New South Wales Government. The service was initially operated by TNT Transit Systems.

In August 1998, SLRC formed a joint venture with CGEA Transport named CGEA Transport Sydney to purchase TNT Transit Systems, who also owned the Sydney Monorail. This resulted in CGEA Transport taking charge of light rail operations. SLRC later combined with CGEA Transport Sydney to become Metro Transport Sydney in 2001, after Connex (renamed from CGEA Transport) sold its share in CGEA Transport Sydney. Connex continued to operate the light rail network. Connex eventually came to be known as Veolia Transport globally in 2005, then became part of Veolia Transdev in 2011.

Metro Transport Sydney was purchased by the Government of New South Wales in March 2012. Veolia Transdev (later just Transdev) remained the operator, operating as Transdev Sydney.

In February 2014, three consortia were short listed to build and operate the CBD and South East Light Rail. The contract also included the right to the operate the Dulwich Hill Line. The three short listed operators were Keolis (iLinQ consortium), Serco (SydneyConnect consortium) and Transdev (Connecting Sydney consortium). In December 2014, the Connecting Sydney consortium (which was renamed ALTRAC Light Rail) was awarded the contract, meaning Transdev retains the right to operate the Dulwich Hill Line. The new contract began in July 2015 and runs until 2034.

Ticketing

When it first opened, the line used its own paper-based ticketing system that was separate from the semi-integrated ticketing systems used by the government owned operators. The light rail operated on a proof-of-payment system, with ticket vending machines provided at all stops. By the time the Lilyfield extension opened, the machines had been switched off and replaced with onboard conductors. Paper tickets were available in single or return with fares based on two zones. Other products available included flat fare day and weekly tickets, some of which also included travel on the monorail prior to that system's closure.

Several tickets were recognised on the light rail but were not sold on board. A "TramLink" ticket which allowed travel on Greater Sydney train services and the light rail was available from railway stations. From 27 June 2011, all MyMultis, the Pensioner Excursion Ticket and Family Funday Sunday were also recognised. This improved integration with the broader Sydney ticketing system led to a 30% to 40% increase in patronage on the line in the first months after introduction. In 2012–13 these products comprised just over half of all tickets used on light rail services.

The smartcard-based Opal ticketing system was introduced to the line on 1 December 2014. Patronage increased in the months following the introduction of Opal. Most paper tickets sold or recognised on light rail services were discontinued on 1 January 2016. The only tickets still available were single and return tickets. These last remaining tickets were replaced by Opal-based single trip tickets on 1 August of that year.

Naming
As the original line of Sydney's light rail network, the Dulwich Hill Line lacked special branding and was simply known as the Sydney Light Rail – and later Metro Light Rail after the system was re-branded. Following the purchase of Metro Transport Sydney by the New South Wales Government and the announcement of the CBD and South East Light Rail, the line was named Inner West Light Rail. Since the opening of the 2014 extension to Dulwich Hill, passenger-facing branding of the line has referred to it as the Dulwich Hill Line. The line was given the number L1 as part of a broader program to also number all Sydney Trains and Sydney Ferries routes.

Patronage
A transport plan released by the New South Wales Government in 1998 reported that the line carried an average of 5,000 passengers on weekdays. 2.8 million journeys were made in 2009–10, increasing to 4.2 million in 2012–13. The partial integration of the line into the broader Sydney ticketing system was a major driver of the increase. In the 12 months to June 2015, the line carried 6.1 million passengers, compared to 3.9 million passengers in the prior year. The increase in the 2014–15 figure was influenced by the opening of the extension to Dulwich Hill in March 2014, while the 2013–14 figure was affected by the suspension of services for much of October 2013 and closures for maintenance works. In the period from 2015 to 2016, 9.7 million journeys were made, followed by 9.1 million in 2016–2017. The 2016–2017 statistic was affected by a partial closure of the line in December 2016/January 2017 for construction works on the CBD and South East Light Rail.

Incidents
The line operated without serious incident until 7 October 2013, when two trams derailed within the space of 20 minutes. Sections of track were replaced in September and it is thought the new track damaged the wheels of the vehicles. All services were suspended and replaced by buses. Services resumed between The Star and Lilyfield on 18 October, and along the full length of the line on 30 October. These incidents occurred in close proximity to Glebe, and 2106 was the only tram to be reported. The front car of it had come off the tracks, and its bogie was destroyed. After loading it onto a pony truck, it was driven under its own power to the depot. It would later be deemed damaged beyond repair and scrapped.

In July 2020, in response to a question about improving capacity on the line, the New South Wales Minister for Transport and Roads said the removal of eighteen crossings would "permit the removal of temporary speed restrictions associated with these crossings and improve journey time performance." The government was also investigating the purchase of four new vehicles to permit service at six minute frequencies, increasing capacity by 1,000 passengers per hour.

Service expansion constraints
In August 2017, a government report, obtained by the media under freedom of information provisions, revealed patronage was "exceeding all expectations" of transport planners. However it was impossible to introduce more peak hour services, which run every eight minutes. This is because of constraints associated with the single track near Dulwich Hill, stabling capacity, power, signalling, maintenance facilities and fleet size. The power supply limits frequency to six minutes, while the single track terminus at Dulwich Hill and fleet size limit frequency to eight minutes. The report suggested it would be possible to have more services per hour if shuttle services were to run between Central and Lilyfield. Patronage is expected to rise further with 4,700 new dwellings either recently completed or under construction along the line. A few stops with difficult access (such as Leichhardt North, Taverners Hill, Dulwich Hill) have longer platforms, indicating that some allowance was made for operating longer vehicles in the future.

2021–2022 service suspension
On 28 October 2021, service was suspended after cracking in welds was discovered in some of the Urbos 3 vehicles during routine inspections. On 2 November, it was revealed that cracks had been found in the entire Urbos 3 fleet of 12 vehicles. On 5 November, it was announced the line would be closed for up to 18 months to allow the fleet to be withdrawn for repairs. These cracks were discovered to be "more significant than first thought". The government announced that there was a "design flaw" in the vehicles and they would be consulting other operators. A replacement bus service was put into operation to run the entire length of the line.

To allow the line to reopen sooner, trams were borrowed from the CBD and South East Light Rail and tested on the Inner West Light Rail from December 2021. L1 services resumed with the borrowed trams on 12 February 2022, but continued to be supplemented by buses between Central & the Star and ferries between Blackwattle Bay and Barangaroo. Customers on the light rail and replacement bus services received a 30 percent fare discount while the Urbos 3 vehicles were repaired.

Rolling stock

The line is currently operated by 12 CAF Urbos 3 vehicles, which have a standard capacity of 206 passengers and a crush capacity of 272. The first Urbos 3s entered service in July 2014, with the final vehicle delivered by the end of June 2015.

When the line first opened, a fleet of seven German-designed Variotrams were built in Dandenong by Adtranz to operate the services. The last Variotram was withdrawn in May 2015, with all put up for sale by tender. Between the opening of the Dulwich Hill extension in March 2014 and the introduction of the first Urbos 3s, the Variotrams were supplemented by four leased Urbos 2 vehicles.

In November 2020, it was announced that four new vehicles would be purchased for delivery within two years.  The new vehicles will allow the service frequency to be reduced to six minutes for an increase in capacity of 1,000 passengers per hour per direction. In June 2021, a contract with CAF for four Urbos 100 (the variant on the current Urbos 3) five-module unit was reported.

Route
Apart from Central, Capitol Square and Paddy's Markets, all stops are located on the route of the former railway line (although buildings have been constructed above and around the line in places). Service frequency is approximate, with light rail operating between Central and Dulwich Hill from 06:00 to 23:00, extending to 00:00 on Friday. Standard weekday frequencies are every 8 minutes during peak hours, every 12 minutes between the peaks and every 15 minutes at other times. Services run every 10 to 15 minutes on weekends (with reduced services before 09:00). The section between Central and The Star is open 24 hours a day, with an overnight frequency of 30 minutes.
[
{
  "type": "ExternalData",
  "service": "page",
  "title": "Inner West Light Rail.map"
},
{
  "type": "ExternalData",
  "service": "page",
  "title": "Inner West Light Rail stops.map"
}
]

Central Grand Concourse

The Central Grand Concourse stop (formerly Central) is the eastern terminus of the line. It serves Central railway station and is located on the first floor, parallel to, but above, Eddy Avenue. The stop connects to the Grand Concourse, Central station's main waiting area and the departure hall for medium and long-distance train services.

The stop is located at the midpoint of a single track unidirectional turning loop around Belmore Park. The stop consists of two platforms. Trams stop at the first platform to allow passengers to alight, then pull up to the second platform to allow boarding. The use of the loop avoids having to terminate the vehicles and the removes the need for the driver to change ends. This loop was not new; it had been used until 1957 as a route on the former Sydney tramway system, but in the opposite direction. The covered area in which the light rail stop is located was previously used as a staff car-park and bus interchange.

Passengers can change at Central for Sydney Trains and NSW TrainLink. Also, the L2 and L3 lines can be accessed at the nearby Central Chalmers Street light rail stop. Sydney metro trains will also serve Central by 2024.

Capitol Square

The Capitol Square stop is opposite the Capitol Theatre, a large theatre for long-stay, popular shows such as The Lion King. The stop is located on Hay Street, near the intersection with George Street. Hay Street is closed to all other traffic. The CBD and South East Light Rail run along George Street, creating a level junction at the intersection. A connection between the two lines was built to enable trams used on the new line to access a maintenance facility at Lilyfield.

Paddy's Markets

The Paddy's Markets stop (formerly Haymarket) is located outside the flea market type Paddy's Markets in Haymarket. The name also belonged to a stop on the former Sydney Monorail. The monorail stop was located to the west of the light rail stop and was originally called Powerhouse Museum. It was connected to a multi-storey car park, with a footbridge across Darling Drive and the light rail providing access to the Powerhouse Museum and the suburb of Ultimo. In 2005, both stops were renamed Paddy's Markets in a naming rights deal.

The area to the north of the light rail stop forms part of a major redevelopment of the Darling Harbour precinct. Prior to redevelopment, a public square existed between the stop and the Sydney Entertainment Centre – a former multi-purpose events venue. The redevelopment plans included the demolition of the Entertainment Centre, car park and monorail stop, and the creation of a 'creative quarter' named Darling Square featuring retail outlets, offices and apartments. The public square adjacent to the light rail stop will be replaced with a new square further to the north. A pedestrian boulevard was constructed through the site of the Entertainment Centre, providing improved access from the stop to Darling Harbour. To prepare for the redevelopment, the monorail closed in June 2013 and demolition of the site commenced in December 2014. The Entertainment Centre was replaced by the ICC Sydney Theatre, located near the Exhibition Centre stop.

To the west of the stop, the light rail crosses Darling Drive and joins the former freight railway corridor. The section of the corridor not being used by the light rail has been converted to a pedestrian pathway, dubbed The Goods Line.

Exhibition Centre

The Exhibition Centre stop serves the suburb of Ultimo and the Darling Harbour precinct. The stop is located between two streets – Darling Drive to the east and Pyrmont Street to the west. It is named after the former Sydney Exhibition Centre – a complex for holding expositions and trade fairs that was located on the opposite side of Darling Drive. A replacement facility on the same site – the International Convention Centre Sydney – was completed in 2016. The stop is now adjacent to the ICC's exhibition precinct and the ICC Sydney Theatre. The Ian Thorpe Aquatic and Fitness Centre is located on the opposite side of Pyrmont Street. The Powerhouse Museum is also nearby. The former Sydney Monorail ran parallel to the light rail next to the stop.

While the monorail ran until June 2013, there was a monorail stop that served the Sydney Exhibition Centre in the 1990s and early 2000s right next to and in parallel with the light rail stop. It closed some time in the mid-2000s. The purpose of this monorail stop was taken over by the Convention monorail/light rail stop, which required day-to-day interchanging between modes to get to this stop.

Convention

The Convention stop is located adjacent to Darling Drive, at the western edge of the Darling Harbour precinct. The stop is named after the former Sydney Convention Centre and its replacement, the International Convention Centre Sydney. There are hotels located on both sides of the stop. The convention precinct of the ICC complex and the Harbourside Shopping Centre are also located adjacent to the stop.

A Sydney Monorail stop with the same name was located a few metres down Darling Drive towards Central. The monorail closed in June 2013.

Pyrmont Bay

The Pyrmont Bay stop is located underneath an apartment building in Pyrmont. The stop services the north western side of the Darling Harbour precinct. It is close to the Australian National Maritime Museum and the Harbourside Shopping Centre. The nearby Pyrmont Bridge provides access to the city.

The Star

The Star stop (formerly Star City) is the primary means of public transport serving The Star casino and entertainment complex, in Pyrmont. The stop is located underneath the casino alongside a bus and coach stop. It also services commercial offices located in the area. Between 00:00 and 06:00, services from Central terminate at The Star. During the COVID-19 pandemic, these overnight services have been suspended since 21 March 2020 until further notice.

John Street Square

The John St Square stop is located in a cutting which has been partly built over by apartments as part of the conversion process from goods railway to light rail. The stop serves the northern end of the Pyrmont peninsula. Since the mid-1990s, the area has been extensively redeveloped with medium density housing and offices.

Fish Market

The Fish Market stop is located in a cutting, adjacent to the Western Distributor in Pyrmont. It serves a mixed employment and medium density residential area, and the nearby Sydney Fish Market. A redevelopment of the fish market was announced in November 2016 and expanded in November 2018. The market will move from its current location to an adjacent site at Blackwattle Bay.

Wentworth Park

The Wentworth Park stop serves a residential area in Pyrmont. Access is available from Wattle Street, Bridge Road and Jones Street. The stop is named after the park on the opposite side of Wattle Street and the Wentworth Park greyhound racing track, located within the park.

The stop opened with a single platform in 1997 when it was the original terminus of the line. When the light rail was extended to Lilyfield in August 2000, a new platform for Lilyfield bound services was opened. A crossover remains just past the city end of the stop. To the west of the stop, a viaduct carries the light rail over Wentworth Park.

Glebe

The Glebe stop is located near the shopping area in Glebe and serves the eastern side of the suburb. A footbridge over Bridge Road connects to the outbound platform. Immediately to the west of the stop is the portal for a tunnel under the suburb of Glebe.

Jubilee Park

The Jubilee Park stop is located adjacent to Jubilee Park on the western side of Glebe. It serves a residential area. Immediately to the east of the stop is the portal for a tunnel under the suburb of Glebe, and to the west is a viaduct crossing the park and Johnstons Creek. It is situated adjacent to the Rozelle Depot of Sydney's former tram network. After tram services ceased the depot became part of the Harold Park Paceway harness racing complex. The paceway closed in 2010 and was redeveloped into medium density housing. The depot was turned into a food-centric retail complex that opened in September 2016, leading to an increase of patronage at the stop.

Rozelle Bay

The Rozelle Bay stop serves a residential area in the north of Annandale. It is on the edge of an embankment adjacent to its namesake bay. Access is via a walkway and steps from The Crescent below or level access from Bayview Crescent.

Lilyfield

The Lilyfield stop serves a residential area in Lilyfield. The stop is located at the edge of a wide cutting, beneath the City West Link road which passes overhead. It is the only stop the line to be built as an island platform. The entrance is on Catherine Street, with access to the platform either by stairs or a lift. The stop was the terminus of the line between 2000 and 2014.

During the corridor's time as a freight railway line, a junction between the Darling Harbour and Rozelle branches of the line was located to the west of the stop, with the stop located on what was the Darling Harbour branch. The junction also marked the western edge of Rozelle railway yard, which accounts for the width of the cutting.

Originally, only the stop's citybound platform was used. A set of points was located past the city end of the stop, allowing the outbound track to merge with the citybound track. There was no track adjacent to the outbound platform and the platform face was fenced off.

As part of the extension to Dulwich Hill, a stabling facility for four trams was built in the cutting, to the west of the stop. The track configuration through the stop was also redesigned. In November 2013, the outbound platform was brought into use and the points at the city end were removed. A new crossover past the outbound end of the stop was installed to enable terminating trams to switch tracks and to provide access to the stabling facility.

Leichhardt North

The Leichhardt North stop is located parallel to the City West Link Road, serving a residential area in Leichhardt. The platforms are not located opposite one another, but are staggered, with the track crossing located between the platforms. There are entrances at either end of the stop. The outbound platform connects to the City West Link / James Street intersection. The citybound platform connects to a pathway that leads to either the southern or northern parts of Charles Street – the latter via a bridge over the City West Link. Immediately to the east of the stop, the light rail passes through a tunnel under the City West Link. Leichhardt Oval is a short walk from the stop.

Hawthorne

The Hawthorne stop is located at the border of Leichhardt and Haberfield. The stop's name is a reference to the Hawthorne Canal which runs parallel to the line through this area. The stop is also located close to the Hawthorne Canal Reserve and Hawthorne Parade.

The platforms are not located opposite one another, but are staggered, with the track crossing located between the platforms. The stop is located in a residential area, but adjacent to parkland on both the Leichhardt and Haberfield sides. Pathways were built between the closest streets – Hawthorne Parade in Haberfield and Darley Road in Leichhardt – including a bridge over the canal. This improved pedestrian access between the two suburbs which had been limited by the railway.

Marion

The Marion stop is located north of Marion Street adjacent to Hawthorne Parade at the border of Leichhardt and Haberfield. Lambert Park soccer stadium is located next to the line on the south side of Marion Street. MarketPlace Leichhardt shopping centre is a short walk from the stop, east along Marion Street. Marion is named after Marion Norton, spouse of James Norton, who was a solicitor and public figure in early colonial New South Wales.

Taverners Hill

The Taverners Hill stop is located on an embankment adjacent to Parramatta Road and the Hawthorne Canal at the border of Lewisham, Summer Hill, Haberfield and Leichhardt. The platforms are not located opposite one another, but are staggered, with the track crossing located between the platforms. A footbridge to the south of the stop over Parramatta Road connects to the citybound platform. Taverners Hill is a well known locality name for the area to the east of the stop extending up Parramatta Road to Norton Street. A long-term plan exists for urban renewal and higher density development around the stop.

Lewisham West

The Lewisham West stop is located on the border of Lewisham and Summer Hill. The platforms are not located opposite one another, but are staggered. The track crossing is located between the northern end of the City platform and the southern end of the Dulwich Hill platform. Access to the stop from the Summer Hill side is via a pathway through the grounds of the former Mungo Scott flour mill.

The stop sits in a medium density residential area which was subject to urban renewal soon after the stop opened. The area on the Lewisham side of the stop featured various light industrial buildings. The Summer Hill side of the stop is dominated by the former flour mill complex, which underwent redevelopment. The mill provided the final traffic for the freight railway line, and the cessation of traffic after the mill's closure provided the catalyst for conversion of the line to light rail. The stop is located adjacent to the flour mill, within walking distance of Lewisham railway station on the Inner West & Leppington Line. The 2014 extension's Product Definition Report describes the positioning of the stop:
The site provides the most practical balance between meeting the interchange opportunity with Lewisham Station and the opportunities of the catchment and its two known developments.

Patronage at this location is currently predicted to come approximately equally from walk-up catchment and from interchange. Future redevelopment will see this balance tip significantly in favour of catchment with the stop potentially becoming a focus of the local area.
Access to the city is quickest via the heavy rail line, but the light rail provides north–south transport, in contrast to the heavy rail's east–west route.

Waratah Mills

The Waratah Mills stop serves a residential area in the northern part of Dulwich Hill. The stop's name is a reference to the former Waratah Mills flour mill located on the opposite side of Davis Street. The mill has been converted to apartments and is a local landmark.

Arlington

The Arlington stop is located adjacent to Constitution Road and Johnson Park in Dulwich Hill. It serves a medium density residential area. The stop's name is a reference to the nearby Arlington Recreation Ground (Oval) – a local sports venue on the opposite side of Johnson Park.

Dulwich Grove

The Dulwich Grove stop is located in a cutting between New Canterbury Road and Hercules Street in Dulwich Hill. Dulwich Grove was the name of one of the area's two earliest land releases and first use of the name Dulwich.

The original design provided access to the stop from both Hercules Street and New Canterbury Road. The access from Hercules Street was subsequently removed from the design with a pathway provided to New Canterbury Road in its place.

Dulwich Hill

The Dulwich Hill stop (known as Dulwich Hill Interchange during planning and construction) is located in the southern part of the suburb of Dulwich Hill, adjacent to Dulwich Hill railway station on the Bankstown Line. The stop sits at the end of Bedford Crescent, where the Rozelle branch line joined the main Metropolitan Goods railway line and is thus the terminus of the light rail.

In the 2014 extension's Environmental Assessment the stop was proposed to be located parallel to the railway station with direct access from Wardell Road. This was to have been achieved by widening the cutting used by the railway lines and removing angle parking on Bedford Crescent. It was proposed to construct an island platform with two tracks.

The design was altered after a review favoured moving the stop to the end of Bedford Crescent. This final design includes a single side platform and is further away from the railway station than the original proposal, but includes a connection to Jack Shanahan Park on the western side of the light rail alignment, which improved access to the park from the east and access to the stop from the west. Other improvements cited were reduced construction cost and environmental impact due to the elimination of the extensive work required to widen the cutting under the original proposal, and the reduced need to interface with RailCorp assets.

In light of increasing patronage on the line, the single track terminus at Dulwich Hill now limits the number of services on the line, with frequency unable to be less than every eight minutes. In 2017, Transport NSW promised to consider upgrading the line to allow more services, including looking at the Dulwich Hill terminus, or alternatives such as running shuttle services to Lilyfield.

The quickest access to the city is via the heavy rail line. The light rail runs to the north, in contrast to the heavy rail's east–west route.

See also
 Transport in Sydney in the 2010s

References

External links

Official Website of the light rail operator Transdev Sydney
Photos of the extension to Dulwich Hill

 
Light rail in Sydney
Railway lines opened in 1997
1997 establishments in Australia